The Fiji national under-19 cricket team represents the Republic of Fiji in international under-19 cricket. The team's first recorded match came at the 1997 Youth Asia Cup, but the majority of its matches have come in the EAP Under-19 Trophy, against other teams in the ICC East Asia-Pacific (EAP) region. Fiji won the 2015 edition of the tournament, and consequently qualified for the 2016 Under-19 World Cup, becoming the first team outside of Papua New Guinea to qualify from the region.

History
Cricket has been played in Fiji since 1874, during the time of the Kingdom of Fiji, when British sailors aboard HMS Pearl introduced the sport to Levuka. It quickly became popular amongst the native Fijians, and the Fijian national side became regular visitors to Australia and New Zealand, playing a number of first-class matches. The Fiji Cricket Association gained associate membership of the International Cricket Council (ICC) in 1965, one of the first three countries to do so, along with Ceylon (now Sri Lanka) and the United States.

Organised under-19 international cricket dates only from the 1970s – the first under-19 Test and One Day International (ODI) were played in 1974 and 1976, respectively, while the first Under-19 World Cup was held in 1988. The Fijian under-19 side's first recorded matches came at the 1997 Youth Asia Cup, which was part of the qualification process for the 1998 World Cup. Their first game was a 134-run loss to Singapore, which was followed by nine-wicket losses to Papua New Guinea and Hong Kong.

Although both Fiji and Papua New Guinea had each recently left the Asian Cricket Council (ACC) to join the recently formed ICC East Asia-Pacific (EAP) organisation, they continued to participate in ACC tournaments for several years, as few EAP tournaments had yet to be organised. Fiji did not participate at the 1999 Youth Asia Cup (the qualifier for the 2000 World Cup), but the following year hosted the inaugural edition of the EAP Under-19 Cricket Trophy. With Hong Kong and Papua New Guinea the only other participating teams, the tournament was played as a double round-robin, with Fiji winless from their four matches. However, in Fiji's first game against Hong Kong, Colin Rika score 129 runs opening the batting, the team's first recorded century, and a tournament record until surpassed by Vanuatu's Andrew Mansale at the 2007 tournament.

No standalone EAP qualifying tournament was held for the 2004 and 2006 World Cups, with two EAP teams (Fiji and Papua New Guinea) instead participating in a combined tournament with African Cricket Association teams. Fiji finished last at the 2003 combined tournament, hosted by Namibia, but did win their first competitive match, defeating Tanzania by two wickets. However, they had earlier lost their opening match against Kenya by 320 runs, conceding 356 runs before being bowled out for 36. At the 2005 combined tournament, Fiji lost all its group matches, but defeated Nigeria by two wickets in the eighth-place playoff, having bowled them out for 46.

The 2007 EAP Under-19 Trophy, the first since 2001, included Japan and Vanuatu for the first time, and Fiji were consequently able to win their first match against another EAP side. In their first innings against Japan (playing only its third recorded under-19 match), Fiji scored 440/8 from its 50 overs, with their captain, Josefa Rika, scoring 257 runs from 147 balls, including 37 fours and 9 sixes. They then dismissed Japan for 53 runs, winning the match by 387 runs. Sekope Biauniceva took 6/13, and both he and Rika's performances remain Fiji under-19 records. A writer for ESPNcricinfo described Rika's innings as "what must rank as one of the most breathtaking knocks in the history of age-group cricket".

Tournament history

Youth Asia Cup
1997: group stages

EAP Under-19 Trophy
2001: 3rd place (3 teams) – hosts
2007: 3rd place (4 teams)
2009: 3rd place (5 teams)
2011: 4th place (5 teams)
2013: 3rd place (4 teams)
2015: 1st place (4 teams)

ICC Africa/EAP Under-19 Championship
2003: 8th place (8 teams)
2005: 7th place (8 teams)

ICC Under-19 World Cup

Team records
Last updated 8 February 2016.

Highest team scores

Lowest team scores
63 (33.2 overs), vs , 7 February 2011, at John Blanck Oval, Maroochydore.

Highest individual scores

Best individual bowling performances

Current squad

References

Under-19 cricket teams
Cricket, under 19
Fiji in international cricket